Conil Club de Fútbol is a Spanish football team based in Conil, in the autonomous community of Andalusia. Founded in 1931, it plays in Tercera División – Group 10, holding home games at Estadio José Antonio Pérez Ureba, with a 1,500-seat capacity.

History
In the 2018-19 season Conil finished in the 17th position in Tercera División, Group 10.

Season to season

11 seasons in Tercera División

Stadium information
Name: Estadio José Antonio Pérez Ureba
City: Conil de la Frontera
Capacity: 4,000
Inauguration: 1990
Pitch size: 105 x 68 m

References

External links
Official website 
Futbolme team profile 

Football clubs in Andalusia
Association football clubs established in 1931
1931 establishments in Spain